The Royal Cache, technically known as TT320 (previously referred to as DB320), is an Ancient Egyptian tomb located next to Deir el-Bahri, in the Theban Necropolis, opposite the modern city of Luxor.

It contains an extraordinary collection of mummified remains and funeral equipment of more than 50 kings, queens, and other royal family members of the New Kingdom, as it was used as a cache for royal mummies during the Twenty-first Dynasty. The eleven pharaohs found there include 1 of the 9 pharaohs from the 17th dynasty, 5 of the 15 pharaohs from the 18th dynasty, 3 of the 8 pharaohs from the 19th dynasty, and 2 of the 10 pharaohs from the 20th dynasty. The tomb was originally used as last resting place of High Priest of Amun Pinedjem II, his wife Nesikhons, and other close family members.

Its discovery by locals in 1871, and by Egyptologists in 1881, caused a sensation. The mummies quickly became a highlight of the new Egyptian Museum (then in Giza). In 1969, the discovery was dramatized in The Night of Counting the Years, which became one of Egypt's most widely respected films. In 2021 the mummies were moved to a modern display area in the new National Museum of Egyptian Civilization, following the high-profile Pharaohs' Golden Parade.

Usage

The tomb is thought to have initially been the last resting place of High Priest of Amun Pinedjem II, his wife Nesikhons, and other close family members. Pinudjem II died around 969 BCE, in a time of decline of the Egyptian kingdom, during which mummies from former dynasties were vulnerable to grave robbery. During Ramesses IX's reign, he had teams that went out and inspected the tombs of pharaohs. If it were discovered that repairs to the tomb or the mummy were needed, arrangements would be made to make the necessary repairs. The tombs that were inspected were found untouched at that time.

During Herihor's reign, however, some tombs and mummies were found to be in need of what they called "renewing the burial places". The tombs of Ramesses I, Seti I, and Ramesses II required "renewing" after pillaging, and this led to the royal mummies being moved to this tomb to protect them, with each coffin given dockets stating when they were moved and where they were reburied; some of the mummies had been moved multiple times before they were placed here.

It was initially believed that this tomb originally belonged to an Eighteenth Dynasty queen who was found buried here. However, mummies were cached here in the Twenty-first Dynasty and the Eighteenth Dynasty queen was found at or near the entrance of the tomb, suggesting that she was placed in it last, which would indicate that this was not her tomb. If this was her tomb she would have been placed at the far, or back, end of the tomb. When the last of the mummies were placed in TT320, it seemed that the opening was naturally covered with sand and possibly other debris such as rocks, rendering it difficult to find.

Discovery and clearance

In 1881, the location of TT320 became publicly known. Later research, conducted by Gaston Maspero, stated that members of the local Abd el-Rassul family discovered TT320 as early as 1871, because items such as canopic jars and funeral papyri from this tomb showed up on the antiquities market in Luxor as early as 1874. For example, the Book of the Dead of Pinudjem II was purchased in 1876 for £400. The story that Ahmed Abd el-Rassul told was that one of his goats fell down a shaft and when he went down the shaft to retrieve the goat, he stumbled across this tomb. As he looked around, he discovered that this was no ordinary tomb. He saw that the mummies entombed in TT 320 were royal. This was indicated by the royal cobra head dress on some of the coffins. Local authorities were expecting to find several tombs belonging to the family of Herihor. When items started appearing on the antiquities market with their names on them began, local authorities started to investigate the items and were able to trace them back to the Abd el-Rassul family. Authorities interrogated and tortured the two brothers until one of the brothers eventually gave up the location of the tomb where the items were plundered from. Authorities were sent out to TT320 immediately to secure it.

On July 6, 1881, authorities arrived at TT320 without the head of the Egyptian Service of Antiquities, because he was on vacation. Instead, the only other European member of the team, Emil Brugsch, was sent with one of the first Egyptian Egyptologists, Ahmed Kamal, to explore and examine TT320. Rather than just exploring, Brugsch had all of the contents, including the mummies, of this tomb removed within 48 hours of them entering this tomb. Neither Brugsch nor Kamal documented the tomb before having the contents removed, which made future study of this tomb difficult. Locations of the coffins were not documented and items were not catalogued. Brugsch went back later to document the tomb but the problem with this is that when he went back, he was not able to remember every detail of the tomb. His recollection of the tomb is questionable since he did not document the details immediately upon entering the tomb. The removal of the items from TT320 so quickly presented problems that the removal team at the time did not take into account.

The hasty removal of the items in TT320 was not done carefully. When the items were received in Cairo, it was discovered that some coffins had damage that would have happened if they were banged around during removal or transport. Evidence suggests that the damage to the coffins happened during removal from TT320. Brugsch documented the height of the different parts of the tomb and the measurement of the opening was just big enough to drag out the coffins. In addition to this, there were fragments of royal coffins and other items found in the bottom meter of debris in TT320. However, there were approximately ten coffins that were found with their foot ends missing. It is believed that this happened before they were placed in TT320 because there was no mention, by Brugsch, of foot ends whether they were whole, in pieces or fragments being found. A research team entered TT320 in 1998 for research and that team did not find any evidence of foot ends either.

Once the coffins/mummies and items made it back to Cairo they were examined. It became clear that some of the mummies were found in the wrong coffins and that they were in different stages of preservation. For instance, the bandages around some of the bodies had been ripped apart in earlier times in order to remove any precious ornaments, such as amulets that were placed on the bodies for protection.

Considering the inconsistencies of some of the mummies mentioned previously, one mummy in particular raises many questions due to inconsistencies in two of his papyri. The first papyrus, Book of the Dead of Djedptahiufankh A was read incorrectly. The person who read it thought that one of Djedptahiuefankh A's titles was part of his name. On the second papyrus, The Amduat papyrus, Djedptahiuefankh A's first title was "the third prophet of Amun". However, he is called "the second prophet of Amun" on his coffin. This is thought to be because the items that had "the third prophet of Amun" were prepared prior to him reaching the position of "the second prophet of Amun". Djedptahiuefankh was believed to be royal because on the Amduat papyrus his "priestly title" is immediately followed by "the king's son" and that is followed by "of Ramesses". Similar text is found on the Book of the Dead papyrus with one exception, "the king's son" is followed by "of the lord of the two lands". This title is what gave the impression that he was royal but that title does not mean that he was royal. In fact it is believed that he was not royal at all. Cynthia Sheikholeslami says that "It is clear that the actual title [of Djedptahiuefankh] should be understood as 'king's son of Ramesses' rather than as an indication of membership in the royal family". There are eight other individuals known to hold this same title. It is argued that this title was given to someone from a certain region, more specifically a town in the Delta called Ramesses.

The chamber is reached by a nearly vertical chimney, which was left open in 1881, and has since filled with rocks and other debris (in fact every object that was left in the tomb has now been damaged in some way). It was reinvestigated in 1938. Since 1998 a Russian-German team led by Erhart Graefe has been working on reinvestigating and preserving the tomb.

Research teams have entered TT320 a number of times since its discovery, but the most successful research team entered TT320 in 1998. They cleared the passageways of fallen debris such as stones and fallen walls. They were able to find fragments of coffins and other small items. They were able to see some paintings after clearing debris away from the walls. These paintings, coupled with the archaeological fragments and the coffins, led this research team to conclude that this tomb was originally owned by a family from the Twenty-first Dynasty as a family tomb.

List of mummies

See also

 List of Theban tombs
 KV35 – Mummy cache in tomb of Amenhotep II
The Night of Counting the Years – A 1969 Egyptian film based on the story of the Abd el-Rasuls

Bibliography

Early publications

 Also available at 
 Catalogue général des antiquités égyptiennes du Musée du Caire N° 61051-61100 The Royal Mummies (1912)
 
 La trouvaille de Deir el-Bahari, 1881, Vingt photographies, par M. E. Brugsch, conservateur-adjoint du Musée de Boulaq, texte par G. Maspero, directeur général des Musées d'Égypte, Le Caire, MOURĖS, 1881
 Maspero, Rapport sur la trouvaille de Deir-el-Bahari, Bulletin de l'Institut Égyptien, 1881, p. 129–169

Recent publications
G. Belova (2009), The "Royal Cache" and the Circumstances of an enigmatic burial. Moscow (in Russian and English)
Sheikholeslami, Cynthia May 2008. A lost papyrus and the royal cache in TT 320 before 1881. In Hawass, Zahi A., Khaled A. Daoud, and Sawsan Abd El-Fattah (eds). The realm of the pharaohs: essays in honor of Tohfa Handoussa 1, 377–400. Kairo: General Organisation for Government Printing Offices.
Wilkinson, Richard H., and Nicholas Reeves 2004.
Graefe, Erhart. The Royal Cache and the Tomb Robberies. In: Nigel Strudwick and John H. Taylor (eds.). The Theban Necropolis: Past, Present and Future. London: British Museum Press, 2003. pp. 75–82

William Max Miller's Theban Royal Mummy Project

References

Buildings and structures completed in the 10th century BC
Theban tombs
Ahmose I
Amenhotep I
Thutmose I
Thutmose II
Thutmose III
Ramesses I
Ramesses II
Ramesses III
Ramesses IX
Seti I
10th-century BC establishments in Egypt
1881 archaeological discoveries